Aftershock Festival is a rock and heavy metal music festival in Sacramento, California, started in 2012.

History
In 2019, the festival expanded to three days, and in 2021 Aftershock expanded to 4 days, October 7 to 10.

Aftershock 2012

Aftershock 2012 – September 23, 2012

 Stone Temple Pilots
 Deftones
 Bush
 Chevelle
 Theory of a Deadman
 Escape the Fate
 Hollywood Undead
 Oleander
 Hell or Highwater
 Otherwise
 Stepchild
 Gemini Syndrome
 Beware of Darkness
 Fallrise

Aftershock 2013

Aftershock 2013 – September 14–15, 2013

Day 1, Saturday September 14:

Monster Energy Main Stage North
Shinedown
Papa Roach
Skillet
P.O.D.
In This Moment
We as Human

Monster Energy Main Stage South
Korn
Megadeth
Buckcherry
Testament
Steel Panther
Otherwise

Ernie Ball Stage
Love and Death
Heaven's Basement
Butcher Babies
Eye Empire
Girl On Fire
Nothing More

Day 2, Sunday September 15:

Monster Energy Main Stage North
Avenged Sevenfold
A Day to Remember
Halestorm
Asking Alexandria
Falling in Reverse
Gemini Syndrome

Monster Energy Main Stage South
Five Finger Death Punch
Volbeat
HIM
All That Remains
Airbourne
Hell or Highwater

Ernie Ball Stage
Filter
Pop Evil
SOiL
Thousand Foot Krutch
Miss May I

Aftershock 2014

Day 1 - September 13, 2014

Monster Energy Main Stage West
 Limp Bizkit
 Tech N9ne
 Black Label Society
 Hellyeah
 Memphis May Fire
 Anti-Mortem

Monster Energy Main Stage North
 Weezer (headliner)
 AWOLNATION
 Bad Religion
 Pepper
 Dead Sara
 The Last Internationale

Monster Energy Main Stage South
 The Offspring (co-headliner)
 Chevelle
 Nothing More
 Fuel
 Sleepwave
 Islander

Coors Light Stage
 Butcher Babies
 Emmure
 Eyes Set to Kill
 Viza
 Dig the Kid

Day 2 - September 14, 2014

Monster Energy Main Stage West
 Godsmack (headliner)
 Seether
 Theory of a Deadman
 Black Stone Cherry
 We Are Harlot
 Escape the Fate

Monster Energy Main Stage North
 Rob Zombie (co-headliner)
 Rise Against
 Pennywise
 Of Mice & Men
 Atreyu
 Otherwise

Monster Energy Main Stage South
 Five Finger Death Punch
 Mastodon
 Buckcherry
 We Came as Romans
 Kyng
 Young Guns

Coors Light Stage
 Lacuna Coil
 Unlocking the Truth
 New Medicine
 Burn Halo
 Fallrise

Aftershock 2015

Day 1 - October 24, 2015

Monster Energy Main Stage North
 Slipknot (headliner)
 Bring Me the Horizon
 Black Veil Brides
 Pop Evil
 Suicidal Tendencies
 Turbowolf

Monster Energy Main Stage South
 Shinedown (co-headliner)
 Breaking Benjamin
 Hollywood Undead
 Helmet
 Art of Dying
 Snot

Monster Energy Main Stage East
 Marilyn Manson
 Seether
 P.O.D.
 All That Remains
 Red Sun Rising
 Devour the Day

Coors Light Stage
 Clutch
 Beartooth
 Hell Or Highwater
 September Mourning
 RavenEye

Day 2 - October 25, 2015

Monster Energy Main Stage North
Faith No More (headliner)
Coheed and Cambria
All Time Low
Sleeping with Sirens
Issues
ONE OK ROCK

Monster Energy Main Stage South
Deftones (co-headliner)
Death from Above 1979
Eagles of Death Metal
Failure
Highly Suspect
Pink Slips
Death Rogen

Monster Energy Main Stage East
Jane's Addiction
Stone Temple Pilots ft. Chester Bennington
Yelawolf
Sevendust
The Sword
Neck Deep

Coors Light Stage
 Glassjaw
 Red Fang
 Madchild
 '68
 Dance Gavin Dance

Aftershock 2016

Day 1 - October 22, 2016

MONSTER ENERGY STAGE
 Tool
 Primus
 The Pretty Reckless
 Baroness
 Avatar
 Whores.
 American Sharks

DISCOVERY STAGE
 Slayer
 Meshuggah
 Anthrax
 Motionless in White
 letlive.
 Big Jesus

CAPITAL STAGE
 Deafheaven
 Face to Face
 Drakulas
 The Shrine
 Æges
 Death Angel

Day 2 - October 23, 2016

MONSTER ENERGY STAGE
 Avenged Sevenfold
 Disturbed
 Chevelle
 Parkway Drive
 Silver Snakes
 The Mendenhall Experiment

DISCOVERY STAGE
 Korn
 Puscifer
 Ghost
 The Amity Affliction
 Ignite

CAPITAL STAGE
 Zakk Sabbath
 Max and Igor Cavalera return to Roots
 Suicide Silence
 Whitechapel
 Some Fear None

Aftershock 2017 

Day 1 - Saturday, October 21, 2017,

MONSTER ENERGY STAGE
 Nine Inch Nails (headliner)
 Run the Jewels
 Stone Sour
 Eagles of Death Metal
 Nothing More
 Greta Van Fleet
 Palaye Royale

BLACKCRAFT STAGE
 A Perfect Circle (co-headliner)
 Mastodon
 Gojira
 Highly Suspect
 Anti-Flag
 Deap Vally

CAPITAL STAGE
 Tech N9ne
 August Burns Red
 Code Orange
 He Is Legend
 Joyous Wolf

Day 2 - Sunday, October 22, 2017,

MONSTER ENERGY STAGE
 Ozzy Osbourne (headliner)
 Halestorm
 Of Mice & Men
 Beartooth
 Butcher Babies
 New Years Day

BLACKCRAFT STAGE
 Five Finger Death Punch (co-headliner)
 In This Moment
 Hollywood Undead
 Suicidal Tendencies
 Starset
 Black Map

CAPITAL STAGE
 Steel Panther
 Fozzy
 Power Trip
 DED
 Them Evils

PREVIOUSLY SCHEDULED BANDS THAT CANCELLED
 Marilyn Manson (due to an onstage injury sustained a few weeks prior)
 Frank Carter & The Rattlesnakes

Aftershock 2018 

Day 1 - Saturday, October 13, 2018,

MONSTER ENERGY STAGE
 Deftones (headliner)
 311
 Action Bronson
 Jonathan Davis
 Sevendust
 Red Sun Rising
 Dirty Honey

DISCOVERY STAGE (PRESENTED BY CYCO FLOWER)
 Godsmack (co-headliner)
 Shinedown
 Underoath
 Asking Alexandria
 The Vinnie Paul Tribute
 Hyro Da Hero
 Viza

CAPITAL STAGE (PRESENTED BY KOLAS)
 Gwar
 Monster Magnet
 Emmure
 Stick to Your Guns
 Wage War
 The Dose
 Provoker

Day 2 - Sunday, October 14, 2018,

MONSTER ENERGY STAGE
 System of a Down (headliner)
 Incubus
 At the Drive-In
 Bullet for My Valentine
 Dorothy
 Amigo the Devil

DISCOVERY STAGE (PRESENTED BY CYCO FLOWER)
 Alice in Chains (co-headliner)
 Slash feat. Myles Kennedy & The Conspirators
 Seether
 Black Veil Brides
 Dance Gavin Dance
 LAW

CAPITAL STAGE (PRESENTED BY KOLAS)
 Everlast
 The Fever 333
 Plague Vendor
 All Them Witches
 Slothrust
 The Jacks

PREVIOUSLY SCHEDULED BANDS THAT CANCELLED

 Hellyeah (cancelled due to Vinnie Paul's death)
 Bad Wolves (cancelled)

Aftershock 2019 

Day 1 - Friday, October 11, 2019,

MONSTER ENERGY STAGE
 Slipknot (headliner)
 Lamb of God
 Dropkick Murphys
 I Prevail
 Philip H. Anselmo & the Illegals

KOLAS DISCOVERY STAGE
 Staind
 Halestorm
 Clutch
 Beartooth
 Motionless in White
 Ded

COORS CAPITAL STAGE
 Sum 41
 The Interrupters
 Knocked Loose
 Angel Du$t
 The Pink Slips
 Santa Cruz

Day 2 - Saturday, October 12, 2019,

MONSTER ENERGY STAGE
 blink-182 (headliner)
 Bring Me the Horizon
 Stone Temple Pilots
 Highly Suspect
 Fishbone
 The Parlor Mob
 Dead Posey

KOLAS DISCOVERY STAGE
 Rob Zombie
 Marilyn Manson
 Bad Religion
 Ghostemane
 Badflower
 Sick Puppies

COORS CAPITAL STAGE
 Fidlar
 Andrew W.K.
 Health
 Ho99o9
 Spirit Adrift

Day 3 - Sunday, October 13, 2019,

MONSTER ENERGY STAGE
 Tool (headliner)
 A Day to Remember
 Gojira
 The Crystal Method
 Brkn Love
 Blue Midnight

KOLAS DISCOVERY STAGE
 Korn
 Chevelle
 Babymetal
 Falling in Reverse
 New Language

COORS CAPITAL STAGE
 Deadland Ritual
 Fu Manchu
 Fire from the Gods
 The Hu
 Evan Konrad

ORIGINALLY SCHEDULED BANDS THAT CANCELLED OR WERE NO SHOWS

 Poppy (no show)
 While She Sleeps (cancelled)
 Broken Hands (cancelled)
 Joyous Wolf (cancelled)
 Architects (cancelled)
 Frank Carter & The Rattlesnakes (cancelled)

Aftershock 2021 
Previously in 2020, it was postponed until 2021 due to the COVID-19 pandemic. Danny Wimmer Presents announced because of the unfortunate events a Thursday night will be added for free for anyone who purchased their tickets in advance.

Day 1 - Thursday, October 7, 2021,

KOLAS STAGE
 Cypress Hill  (headliner)
 Anthrax
 Knocked Loose
 Destroy Boys

COORS LIGHT STAGE
 Testament
 Exodus
 Death Angel
 Oxymorrons

Day 2 - Friday, October 8, 2021,

JACK DANIEL'S STAGE
 Metallica (headliner)
 Rancid
 Dropkick Murphys
 Avatar
 Des Rocs
 Ayron Jones

KOLAS STAGE
 Volbeat
 Seether
 Skillet
 Pop Evil
 Crobot

COORS LIGHT STAGE
 Suicidal Tendencies
 Butcher Babies
 Cleopatrick
 Black Map
 Unity TX
 Contracult Collective

Day 3 - Saturday, October 9, 2021,

JACK DANIEL'S STAGE
 Mudvayne
 Gojira
 Atreyu
 August Burns Red
 Ded
 The Black Moods

KOLAS STAGE
 The Original Misfits (headliner)
 The Offspring
 Machine Gun Kelly
 Badflower
 Bones UK
 Blame My Youth

COORS LIGHT STAGE
 Body Count
 Anti-Flag
 Alien Weaponry
 South of Eden
 Another Day Dawns
 American Teeth

Day 4- Sunday, October 10, 2021,

JACK DANIEL'S STAGE
 Metallica (headliner)
 Social Distortion
 Pennywise
 Black Veil Brides
 Mammoth WVH
 The Blue Stones

KOLAS STAGE
 Rise Against
 Mastodon
 In This Moment
 Steel Panther
 Law

COORS LIGHT STAGE
 Yelawolf
 Grandson
 All Good Things
 The Cold Stares
 Widow 7

ORIGINALLY SCHEDULED BANDS THAT WERE CANCELLED
 My Chemical Romance (headliner) [cancelled] 
 Limp Bizkit (cancelled)
 Faith No More (cancelled due to Mike Patton's mental health issues)
 From Ashes to New (cancelled)
 Parkway Drive
 Fit for a King
 Live
 Hatebreed

Aftershock 2022 

Day 1 - Thursday, October 6, 2022
JACK DANIEL'S STAGE

 Slipknot (headliner)
 Evanescence
 Killswitch Engage
 Nothing More
 Crown the Empire
 Vended

KOLAS STAGE

 Rob Zombie
 Stone Temple Pilots
 Ghostemane
 Ice Nine Kills
 Dead Sara
 Solence

DW PRESENT'S STAGE

 Code Orange
 Royal & the Serpent
 POORSTACY
 Fit For An Autopsy
 Superbloom

COORS LIGHT STAGE

 Bad Religion
 Alexisonfire
 Cherry Bombs
 PRONG
 Taipei Houston
 Ego Kill Talent

Day 2 - Friday, October 7, 2022
JACK DANIEL'S STAGE

 Kiss (headliner)
 Danzig
 Falling in Reverse
 Clutch
 Spiritbox
 AEIR

KOLAS STAGE

 Lamb of God
 Chevelle
 Motionless in White
 Jeris Johnson
 Joey Valence & Brae
 Orbit Culture

DW PRESENT'S STAGE

 Gwar
 Apocalyptica
 Nemophila
 Set It Off
 For The Better

COORS LIGHT STAGE

 Meshuggah
 In Flames
 Helmet
 Mike's Dead
 Archetypes Collide
 Hot Crazy

Day 3 - Saturday, October 8, 2022
JACK DANIEL'S STAGE

 My Chemical Romance (headliner)
 A Day to Remember
 Yungblud
 Beartooth
 Thursday
 Lilith Czar

KOLAS STAGE

 Papa Roach
 Halestorm
 Theory of a Deadman
 Thrice
 Airbourne
 Eva Under Fire

DW PRESENT'S STAGE
 The Emo Night Tour
 L.S. Dunes
 Enter Shikari
 Zeal & Ardor
 Point North
 Crooked Teeth

COORS LIGHT STAGE

 City Morgue
 Ho99o9
 The Chats
 Mothica
 Trash Boat
 As You Were

Day 4 - Sunday, October 9, 2022
JACK DANIEL'S STAGE

 Muse (headliner)
 Bring Me the Horizon
 The Pretty Reckless
 The Struts
 Dirty Honey
 New Years Day

KOLAS STAGE

 Shinedown
 Black Label Society
 The Interrupters
 Underoath
 The Warning
 Maggie Lindemann

DW PRESENT'S STAGE
 Bayside
 Carolesdaughter
 Classless Act
 Jared James Nichols
 Bloodywood
 Heartsick

COORS LIGHT STAGE

 Action Bronson
 Amigo The Devil
 Band-Maid
 The Alive
 The Bobby Lees

Originally scheduled bands that were cancelled
 Foo Fighters (headliner)

 Jelly Roll

Aftershock 2023 

Day 1, Thursday October 5:

 Incubus (headliner)
 Avenged Sevenfold (headliner)
 Turnstile (headliner)
 The Cult
 AFI
 Pennywise
 Nothing but Thieves
 L7
 White Reaper
 Senses Fail
 Don Broco
 The Bronx
 Nothing,Nowhere
 DeathByRomy
 Beauty School Dropout
 Bob Vylan
 Holding Absence
 Pinkshift
 Thousand Below
 Starbenders
 SeeYouSpaceCowboy
 Static Dress
 Letdown.

Day 2, Friday October 6:

 Godsmack (headliner)
 Tool (headliner)
 Limp Bizkit (headliner)
 Megadeth
 Coheed & Cambria
 Skillet
 Bad Omens
 The Hu
 Deafheaven
 Memphis May Fire
 Converge
 Fire From the Gods
 Polaris
 Rain City Drive
 Gideon
 Currents
 Varials
 Strange Kids
 Dragged Under
 Tallah
 Hanabie.
 Widow7
 Death Valley Dreams

Day 3, Saturday October 7:

 Pantera (headliner)
 Korn (headliner)
 311 (headliner)
 Corey Taylor
 Parkway Drive
 BABYMETAL
 Polyphia
 Dethklok
 Avatar
 Fever 333
 The Amity Affliction
 Sleep Token
 Escape the Fate
 Boston Manor
 Fame on Fire
 Catch Your Breath
 Ten56.
 REDDSTAR
 Holy Wars
 '68
 Ithaca
 Devil's Cut
 Traitors
 Fox Lake
 All Waves
 As You Were

Day 4, Sunday October 8:

 Queens of the Stone Age (headliner)
 Guns N' Roses (headliner)
 Rancid (headliner)
 I Prevail
 Dance Gavin Dance
 Daughtry
 Badflower
 Billy Talent
 Mayday Parade
 Suicide Silence
 Movements
 Ayron Jones
 You Me At Six
 Dead Poet Society
 Austin Meade
 Jehnny Beth
 Redlight King
 Tigercub
 Call Me Karizma
 Ryan Oakes
 Gnome
 Luna Aura
 Asava

See also
Ozzfest
Uproar Festival
Mayhem Festival

References

External links

Heavy metal festivals in the United States
Music of California
Rock festivals in the United States
2012 establishments in California